Shadow of a Doubt is a 1943 film directed by Alfred Hitchcock.

Shadow of a Doubt or Shadow of Doubt may also refer to:

Film and television

Films
 Shadow of Doubt (1935 film), an American mystery film
 Shadow of a Doubt (1991 film), an American television film
 Shadow of a Doubt (1993 film), a French drama film 
 Shadow of a Doubt (1995 film), an American television film written and directed by, and starring, Brian Dennehy
 Shadow of Doubt (1998 film), an American independent mystery-thriller film
 Shadow of Doubt, a 2013 documentary by Eve Ash

Television episodes
 "Shadow of a Doubt" (The Best Years episode)
 "Shadow of a Doubt" (Dallas)
 "Shadow of a Doubt" (Mona the Vampire)
 "A Shadow of Doubt" (Duggan)

Music

Albums
 Shadow of a Doubt (album), by Freddie Gibbs, 2015
 Shadow of Doubt (album), by Skrew, 1996
 Shadow of Doubt, by Bonesaw, featuring Shane Valdez, 1995

Songs
 "Shadow of a Doubt" (song), by Earl Thomas Conley, 1991
 "Shadow of a Doubt", by Beth Orton from Comfort of Strangers, 2005
 "Shadow of a Doubt", by Petra from God Fixation, 1998
 "Shadow of a Doubt", by Roxette from Look Sharp!, 1988
 "Shadow of a Doubt", by Sonic Youth from Evol, 1986
 "Shadow of a Doubt (A Complex Kid)", by Tom Petty and the Heartbreakers from Damn the Torpedoes, 1979
 "A Shadow of Doubt", by Danny Elfman from the Batman Returns film soundtrack, 1992

Other uses
 The Shadow of Doubt, a 1955 play by Norman King
 Shadow of Doubt: Probing the Supreme Court, a 2010 book by Marites Vitug

See also
 Beyond the shadow of a doubt, a legal standard of proof